Troubleshooter is a 2006 thriller fiction novel written by Gregg Hurwitz. It is the third of the 4-part series named "Tim Rackley" from the author.

The follow-up book, the last of the series, Last Shot was published in September 2007.

Dramatisation
In 2012, it was reported that TNT and Shawn Ryan were working with the author to dramatise the series.

References

External links
 

2006 novels
American thriller novels
2006 American novels
United States Marshals Service in fiction
Books by Gregg Hurwitz